A left-leaning red–black (LLRB) tree is a type of self-balancing binary search tree. It is a variant of the red–black tree and guarantees the same asymptotic complexity for operations, but is designed to be easier to implement.

Properties of a left-leaning red–black tree 

Specifically, in a left-leaning red-black 2–3 tree built from  random keys:
 A random successful search examines  nodes.
 The average tree height is about 
 The average size of left subtree exhibits log-oscillating behavior.

External links

Papers
 Robert Sedgewick. Left-leaning Red–Black Trees. Direct link to PDF.
 Robert Sedgewick. Left-Leaning Red–Black Trees (slides).  Two versions:
 Robert Sedgewick. Left-Leaning Red–Black Trees (slides), from seminar at Dagstuhl in February 2008. Outdated.
 Robert Sedgewick. Left-Leaning Red–Black Trees (slides), from April 2008; updated
 Linus Ek, Ola Holmström and Stevan Andjelkovic. May 19, 2009. Formalizing Arne Andersson trees and Left-leaning Red–Black trees in Agda
 Julien Oster. March 22, 2011. An Agda implementation of deletion in Left-leaning Red–Black trees
 Kazu Yamamoto. 2011.10.19. Purely Functional Left-Leaning Red–Black Trees

Implementations

Other
 Robert Sedgewick. 20 Apr 2008. Animations of LLRB operations
 Open Data Structures - Section 9.2.2 - Left-Leaning Red–Black Trees, Pat Morin
 Left-Leaning Red-Black Trees Considered Harmful

Search trees